Uspenskoye is a rural locality (a selo) in Semizerye Rural Settlement, Kaduysky District, Vologda Oblast, Russia. The population was 14 as of 2002.

Geography 
Uspenskoye is located 60 km northwest of Kaduy (the district's administrative centre) by road. Zaruchevye is the nearest rural locality.

References 

Rural localities in Kaduysky District